Donner Peak is an 8,019-foot-elevation (2,444 meter) summit in Placer County, California, United States.

Description
Donner Peak is located one mile southeast of Donner Pass, on land managed by Tahoe National Forest. It is situated in the Sierra Nevada mountain range, with precipitation runoff from the peak draining to Donner Lake. Neighbors include George R. Stewart Peak,  to the north, and line parent Mount Judah,  to the south. The Pacific Crest Trail traverses the west slope of the peak, providing an approach from Donner Pass.

History
This landform's toponym was officially adopted in October 1940 by the U.S. Board on Geographic Names, having appeared on an 1873 topographic map made by California Geological Survey. The mountain was also called "Donner Peak" during 1865 construction of the route for the Central Pacific Railroad. The railroad originally traversed the steep north cliffs of the peak via tunnels and snow sheds before the 10,322-foot-long (3,146 m) Tunnel #41 running under Mount Judah and Donner Peak was opened in 1925. The peak, pass, and lake are named for the ill-fated Donner Party who spent the winter of 1846–1847 snowbound at the east end of Donner Lake.

Climate
According to the Köppen climate classification system, Donner Peak is located in an alpine climate zone. Most weather fronts originate in the Pacific Ocean and travel east toward the Sierra Nevada mountains. As fronts approach, they are forced upward by the peaks (orographic lift), causing them to drop their moisture in the form of rain or snowfall onto the range. There are five ski areas at Donner Pass.

Gallery

See also
 
 Donner Pass

References

External links
 Donner Peak Rock Climbing: Mountainproject.com
 Donner Peak weather: Mountain-forecast.com

North American 2000 m summits
Mountains of Northern California
Tahoe National Forest
Mountains of the Sierra Nevada (United States)
Mountains of Placer County, California